is a Japanese video game music composer. She composed various soundtracks for Capcom games, including multiple in the Mega Man series. She has occasionally been credited as Akari Groves, taking the surname of her husband.

Career
Kaida was a jazz piano major in college, spending her first year at the Osaka College of Music before joining Capcom in 1994. She became a freelance composer in 2005, but still continued to work on various Capcom projects, most recently becoming part of the Inti Creates sound team for Mega Man games.

Works

References

External links
 Brave Wave profile
 

1974 births
Capcom people
Freelance musicians
Japanese women composers
Living people
Musicians from Hyōgo Prefecture
Video game composers
Osaka College of Music alumni